Avishay Cohen (born 19 June 1995) is an Israeli footballer who currently plays at Beitar Jerusalem.

Notes

1995 births
Living people
Israeli footballers
Footballers from Jerusalem
Beitar Jerusalem F.C. players
Beitar Tel Aviv Bat Yam F.C. players
Hapoel Katamon Jerusalem F.C. players
Bnei Yehuda Tel Aviv F.C. players
Israeli Premier League players
Liga Leumit players
Association football forwards